is a railway station located in Asahikawa, Hokkaido, Japan, operated by the Hokkaido Railway Company (JR Hokkaido).

Lines
Shin-Asahikawa Station is served by the Soya Main Line and is also the official starting point of the Sekihoku Main Line, although all local trains originate and terminate at Asahikawa Station.

Adjacent stations

History
The station opened on 4 November 1922. With the privatization of Japanese National Railways (JNR) on 1 April 1987, the station came under the control of JR Hokkaido.

See also
 List of railway stations in Japan

External links
JR Hokkaido station information 

Railway stations in Japan opened in 1922
Railway stations in Hokkaido Prefecture
Buildings and structures in Asahikawa